The 2006 Porsche Michelin Supercup season was the 14th Porsche Supercup season. The races were all supporting races in the 2006 Formula One season. It travelled to nine circuits across Europe, to Bahrain and a double-header at Indianapolis, USA.

Teams and drivers

Race calendar and results

Championship standings

† — Drivers did not finish the race, but were classified as they completed over 90% of the race distance.

 – Scored points despite not finishing the race or being classified.

Teams' Championship

References

External links
The Porsche Mobil 1 Supercup website
Porsche Mobil 1 Supercup Online Magazine

Porsche Supercup seasons
Porsche Supercup